Nicky Booth (21 January 1980 – 13 January 2021) was a British professional boxer who competed from 1998 to 2003. He challenged once for the IBO bantamweight title in 2001. At regional level, he held the British bantamweight title from 2000 to 2003 and the Commonwealth bantamweight title from 2000 to 2002. He was the younger brother of former boxer Jason Booth.

Booth died on 13 January 2021, at the age of 40.

Professional boxing record

References

External links

1980 births
2021 deaths
Bantamweight boxers
Boxers from Nottingham
English male boxers
Place of death missing